Alexander James Rodriguez (also known as AJ Rodriguez) is a Spanish-born British actor and singer best known for his voice acting in a variety animated productions including the 2020 Golden-Globe winner and Academy Awards-nominee Missing Link, and for being the voice of Cardamon on the Netflix show Bee and PuppyCat.

Life and career 
Alexander was born in Marbella, Spain. In 2014 Alexander joined SAG-AFTRA.

In 2015, Alexander joined the cast of Appropriate at the Mark Taper Forum in Los Angeles.

The actor progressed into music in May 2020, when he recorded pop records, including the title "My Crew" released during the COVID 19 pandemic lockdown.

In September 2020, Alexander was cast in the film Where Sweet Dreams Die; and was attached to the TV documentary series, Content is King.

Alexander James Rodriguez received the Rising Star Award (Male) in January 2021 at the 11th Annual Hollywood Music in Media Awards for his song, "My Crew", and in May, he released his summer anthem, "California". He released his first Spanish-English hybrid song "Bella Loquita" in July 2021. Since then, Alexander has gone on to release multiple pop records in both English and Spanish.

Work

Film

Television

Discography

References

External links 
 
 
 

Living people
British pop singers
English expatriates in Spain
English expatriates in the United States
English male child actors
English male film actors
English male stage actors
English male television actors
English male voice actors
People from London
People from Marbella
Year of birth missing (living people)